Kysnesstranda is a village in the Ullensvang municipality, Vestland county, Norway. The village lies along the southern shore of the Hardangerfjorden.

History
Kysnesstranda was historically part of the old municipality of Strandebarm.  Strandebarm included territory on both sides of the Hardangerfjorden. In 1826, the most of Strandebarm located east of the fjord was separated from Strandebarm to create the new municipality Ullensvang; however, the village of Kysnesstranda and the area surrounding it remained a part of Strandebarm despite its location on the east side of the fjord.  On 1 January 1964, when Strandebarm municipality was merged into the neighboring municipality of Kvam, the Kysnesstranda area was merged into Jondal.  Kysnesstranda had 100 inhabitants at that time. Then in 2020, all of Jondal was merged into Ullensvang Municipality.

References

Villages in Vestland
Ullensvang